Anthony "Tony" Begovich (born 7 August 1967) is a former Australian rules footballer who played with the West Coast Eagles and the Sydney Swans in the Australian Football League (AFL) during the early 1990s.

Begovich was selected by West Coast as a post-season pick in the 1989 VFL draft, from Claremont. He played nine times in the 1990 AFL season, including a semi final and preliminary final. A defender, he was hampered by injuries after his debut season and in the 1992 AFL draft was traded to Sydney along with Scott Watters, in return for the first pick of the draft, Drew Banfield.

References

1967 births
West Coast Eagles players
Sydney Swans players
Claremont Football Club players
Living people
People educated at Newman College, Perth
Australian rules footballers from Perth, Western Australia